Daniel Peter Huttenlocher is an American computer scientist, academic administrator and corporate director. He is the inaugural dean of the Schwarzman College of Computing at the Massachusetts Institute of Technology. Previously, he was the inaugural dean and vice provost of Cornell Tech at Cornell University, and a director of Amazon. He joined the department of computer science at Cornell in 1988, and he owned 24 patents in computer vision by 2015.

Before Cornell, Huttenlocher had previously worked at the Xerox Palo Alto Research Center and was Chief Technology Officer at Intelligent Markets. He attended the University of Chicago Laboratory Schools and has an undergraduate degree from the University of Michigan and earned his master's and doctorate (1988) degrees from MIT, the latter under Shimon Ullman.

In February 2019, he was named by MIT to be the head of its new Schwarzman College of Computing starting in August 2019.

Books
The Age of AI. And Our Human Future, with Henry A. Kissinger and Eric Schmidt, Little, Brown and Company, New York, 2021

References

Living people
University of Michigan alumni
Massachusetts Institute of Technology alumni
Cornell University faculty
Cornell Tech faculty
American computer scientists
American corporate directors
Amazon (company) people
Year of birth missing (living people)
American chief technology officers